Wude may refer to:

Wude, Chinese era name used by Emperor Gaozu of Tang during his reign (618–626)
Wude or "martial morality", an ethical system taught in Chinese martial arts
WUDE,  a radio station (94.3 FM) licensed to serve Forest Acres, South Carolina, United States
WYAY (FM),  a radio station (106.3 FM) licensed to serve Bolivia, North Carolina, United States, which held the call sign WUDE from 2013 to 2020
WCOR-FM, a radio station (96.7 FM) licensed to serve Portville, New York, United States, which held the call sign WUDE from 2020 to 2021

See also
Wu De (1913–1995), Chinese politician